Sir Peter Halkett, 2nd Baronet (21 June 1695 – 9 July 1755) was a Scottish baronet who served in the British army and was Member of Parliament for Stirling Burghs from 1734 to 1741.

His regiment was posted to North America during the 1754–1763 French and Indian War; he and his youngest son James served in the ill-fated Braddock Expedition and were killed at the Battle of Monongahela, on 9 July 1755.

Life

Peter Halkett was born 21 June 1695, eldest son of Sir Peter Wedderburn, who changed his surname to Halkett in 1705 when he inherited Pitfirrane Castle, near Dunfermline from his wife's brother. The house remained in the family until 1951 and is now the clubhouse for Dunfermline Golf Club.

In 1728, he married Lady Amelia Stuart, daughter of Francis, Earl of Moray; they had 3 sons, Peter, Francis and James (died 1755). Francis served as Brigade-major during the 1758 Forbes Expedition, when he retrieved the bodies of his father and younger brother.

Career
In 1717, Halkett was commissioned in the Royal Scots and elected Member of Parliament for Stirling Burghs in 1734. He supported the Walpole administration but declined to stand again in 1741. Instead, he was appointed lieutenant-colonel of the 44th Foot, a new regiment raised by James Long.

During the 1745 Rising, he was in temporary command when the 44th was overrun at the Battle of Prestonpans, and captured. The Jacobites were unable to house their prisoners and he was released with other officers, after agreeing he would not serve against them for 18 months. Pressed by his commander, Prince William, Duke of Cumberland, to break his oath, he resisted and was dismissed from the Army. He succeeded his father as second baronet in 1746.

He was re-instated after appealing to George II and in 1751 made Colonel of the regiment, which in 1754 was transferred to the British colonies in North America. The following year, the 44th was assigned to the Braddock Expedition to capture Fort Duquesne (located in present-day Pittsburgh, Pennsylvania, USA) from the French. The column ran into a combined force of French, Canadian and native Indian troops in the woods and were severely routed. Halkett was amongst the officers killed.

References

Sources

External links
 

1695 births
1755 deaths
People from Fife
British Army personnel of the Jacobite rising of 1745
British military personnel of the French and Indian War
Royal Scots officers
44th Regiment of Foot officers
Baronets in the Baronetage of Nova Scotia
Members of the Parliament of Great Britain for Scottish constituencies
British MPs 1734–1741